The 1970–71 Shell Shield season was the fifth edition of what is now the Regional Four Day Competition, the domestic first-class cricket competition for the countries of the West Indies Cricket Board (WICB). The tournament was sponsored by Royal Dutch Shell, with matches played from 22 January to 23 April 1971.

Five teams contested the competition – Barbados, the Combined Islands, Guyana, Jamaica, and Trinidad and Tobago. Trinidad and Tobago and Jamaica both won two and drew two of their four matches, but Trinidad and Tobago finished with more points, winning a second consecutive title. Trinidadian batsman Joey Carew led the tournament in runs for a second consecutive season, while Jamaican fast bowler Uton Dowe was the leading wicket-taker.

Points table

Key

 Pld – Matches played
 W – Outright win (12 points)
 L – Outright loss (0 points)

 DWF – Drawn, but won first innings (6 points)
 DLF – Drawn, but lost first innings (2 points)
 Pts – Total points

Statistics

Most runs
The top five run-scorers are included in this table, listed by runs scored and then by batting average.

Most wickets

The top five wicket-takers are listed in this table, listed by wickets taken and then by bowling average.

References

West Indian cricket seasons from 1970–71 to 1999–2000
1971 in West Indian cricket
Regional Four Day Competition seasons
Domestic cricket competitions in 1970–71